To Kill a Tiger is a Canadian documentary film, directed by Nisha Pahuja and released in 2022. The film centres on a family in Jharkhand, India, who are campaigning for justice after their teenage daughter was brutally raped.

The film premiered at the 2022 Toronto International Film Festival on September 10, 2022, and was named the winner of the festival's award for Best Canadian Film.

The film was named to TIFF's annual year-end Canada's Top Ten list for 2022. It received three Canadian Screen Award nominations at the 11th Canadian Screen Awards in 2023, for Best Feature Length Documentary, Best Editing in a Documentary (Mike Munn, Dave Kazala) and Best Original Music in a Documentary (Jonathan Goldsmith).

References

External links

2022 films
2022 documentary films
Canadian documentary films
National Film Board of Canada documentaries
Films about Indian Canadians
Documentary films about India
2020s Canadian films